The Tuvalu Police Force is the national Police force of Tuvalu, it is headquartered in Funafuti and includes a Maritime Surveillance Unit, Customs, Prisons and Immigration. Police officers wear British style uniforms.

Police powers and responsibilities

The police service is managed in accordance with the Police Powers and Duties Act (2009) and the Police Powers and Duties Regulations (2012). The powers of arrest and search are described in Part III of the Criminal Procedure Code (1963).

The Penal Code (1965) is a codification of what crimes under Law of Tuvalu. This legislation is published online by the Office of the Attorney General of Tuvalu; also by the Pacific Islands Legal Information Institute, with the law set out in the 2008 Revised Edition; with a list of current legislation (up to 2012).

Status under the Constitution of Tuvalu
According to the Constitution of Tuvalu,

Role in maritime surveillance

The HMTSS Te Mataili, a Pacific Forum patrol vessel, given to Tuvalu, from Australia, from October 1994 to early 2019.  Australia agreed to provide these vessels to smaller neighbours in the Pacific Forum, after the United Nations Convention on Laws of the Seas extended maritime nations Exclusive Economic Zones to 200 kilometers.  Australia agreed its own security was improved if it gave its smaller neighbours vessels that enabled them to protect their own sovereignty, perform search and rescue, fishery patrol, and prevent smuggling.  Australia replaced the Te Mataili with a larger and more capable Guardian class patrol vessel in April, 2019, named HMTSS Te Mataili II.

Regional Assistance Mission to Solomon Islands

Tuvalu provided police officers to the Regional Assistance Mission to Solomon Islands from December 2004. Tuvaluan Police officer Fanini Maleko was the contingent commander of the Tuvaluan police serving as part of RAMSI's Participating Police Force (PPF).

Social institutions of Tuvalu

Each island has its own high-chief, or ulu-aliki, and several sub-chiefs (alikis). The community council is the Falekaupule (the traditional assembly of elders) or te sina o fenua (literally: "grey-hairs of the land"). As defined in the Falekaupule Act (1997), Falekaupule means "traditional assembly in each island...composed in accordance with the Aganu of each island". Aganu means traditional customs and culture.

Section 41 and Schedule 3 of the Falekaupule Act (1997) provides that “[i]t shall be the duty of every Falekaupule and of every Kaupule to use its resources to assist the police in the detection and prevention of crime within the area of its authority.”

References

External links
 THE CONSTITUTION OF TUVALU
 https://web.archive.org/web/20070928014119/http://www.ramsi.org/node/29
 http://www.tuvalu-news.tv/archives/2006/12/tuvalu_police_toughening_up_on.html
 http://www.tuvaluislands.com/gov_addresses.htm
 http://www.isiservicescorp.com/mjcpatch.html

 
Politics of Tuvalu
Law of Tuvalu